Marmaduke Constable (c. 1456/7–1518) was an English soldier.

Marmaduke Constable may also refer to:

 Sir Marmaduke Constable I, High Sheriff of Yorkshire in the 1360s
Marmaduke Constable (died 1545), MP
Marmaduke Constable (died 1574)
Marmaduke Constable, 2nd Baronet (1619–)
Marmaduke Constable, 4th Baronet (1682–1746)